Nathan Ashmore (born 22 February 1990) is an English footballer who plays as a goalkeeper for National League side Boreham Wood.

Career
Ashmore signed schoolboy terms for Portsmouth and featured in a youth team alongside Premier League players Joel Ward and Matt Ritchie. His senior career started at Havant & Waterlooville before a successful loan spell at Gosport Borough turned into a permanent move. Ashmore helped Gosport to successive promotions to National League South before being snapped up by Ebbsfleet United in March 2016 to help with their promotion push to the National League, although Ebbsfleet would have to rely on the play-offs after finishing second behind Maidenhead United in 2016/17. Ashmore would sign on loan for the Magpies nearly five years later. At Ebbsfleet, Ashmore won the Player of the Season award two years running.

In 2019, Ashmore was signed on loan by Boreham Wood, with manager Luke Garrard saying: “I think he’s a top, top goalkeeper at this level." The move was later made permanent and at the start of the 2021–22 National League season, Ashmore kept four clean sheets in a row. Ashmore signed a new two-year contract with Boreham Wood in the summer of 2022.

Personal life
Ashmore grew up in Buckland, Portsmouth, where he suffered bullying and racist abuse at the hands of a local gang of children. He has also suffered abuse from fans on the pitch. While playing for Ebbsfleet at his future club Boreham Wood in November 2018, Ashmore jumped into the crowd to confront abusive fans. At Chesterfield he was insulted by a pitch invader. Ashmore has been an advocate for change in the sport, giving interviews on the subject to the BBC and talkSport. He still lives in Portsmouth with his wife and daughter.

References

External links
Profile at Soccerway.com
Profile at Eurosport.co.uk

 

1990 births
Living people
English footballers
Association football goalkeepers
Portsmouth F.C. players
Havant & Waterlooville F.C. players
Gosport Borough F.C. players
Ebbsfleet United F.C. players
Boreham Wood F.C. players
Maidenhead United F.C. players
National League (English football) players
Southern Football League players